Daviess County is the name of several counties in the United States (all named for Joseph Hamilton Daveiss):
 Daviess County, Indiana 
 Daviess County, Kentucky
 Daviess County, Missouri

See also
 Jo Daviess County, Illinois